Mukesh Kumar (born 1 August 1965) is a professional golfer from India who currently plays on the Professional Golf Tour of India (PGTI). He has won six Order of Merit titles on the PGTI and on earlier Indian tours. In terms of professional wins he is one of India's most successful golfers. He won his first Asian Tour event in 2016 at the Panasonic Open India.

Professional career
Kumar has an illustrious career with over 100 professional wins and was the Indian Champion Golfer of the Year for 2000/2001. In 2004/2005 Kumar had 19 top-10s in 22 starts with 5 wins and 5 runners-up on the AMBI PGAI Tour.

After a 15-year career with 87 career titles, Kumar won his first event at the highly regarded Delhi Golf Club in those 15 years at the PSPB Open Petroleum Golf Championship with a three stroke win over Shiv Chawrasia and Digvijay Singh. It was his second win of 2005 to go along with his win in January at the Eastern Open and 3rd win on the AMBI PGAI Tour.

In his 2002/2003 season on the Hero Honda PGA Tour he had 11 wins, the most by anyone in that Tours history.

Kumar won his 100th professional event at the 2008 Tata Open.

Kumar's best year on the PGTI was in the 2007/2008 season, where he had four wins, 11 top-10s and his 6th Order of Merit title in India. He added a 5th career PGTI Tour win at the Solaris Chemtech Open in February 2005. His 6th win came in May at the DDA Golf Open. The win took him to the top spot on the Order of Merit. He is the career earnings leader on the PGTI. His 7th win came at the Tamil Nadu Open in August. He won the Indianoil Xtra Premium Golf Masters in October for his 8th PGTI win, taking him to second on the Order of Merit, behind Gaganjeet Bhullar.

In December 2016 at age 51, Kumar won his first Asian Tour title at the Panasonic Open India.

Professional wins (51)

Asian Tour wins (1)

*Note: The 2016 Panasonic Open India was shortened to 54 holes due to weather.
1Co-sanctioned by the Professional Golf Tour of India

Professional Golf Tour of India wins (21)

*Note: The 2016 Panasonic Open India was shortened to 54 holes due to weather.
1Co-sanctioned by the Asian Tour

PGA of India Tour wins (5)
2004 Hyundai-TNGF Open, Indian Oil Servo Masters
2005 Eastern Open, Airtel Open, PSPB Open Petroleum Golf Championship

Other wins (25)
1997 BPGC-ANZ Grindlays Golf Championship
1998 BPGC-ANZ Grindlays Golf Championship
2001 Leela-BGC Open, BPGC Open, TNGF Open, Sher-e-Kashmir Open
2002 Padampat Singhania Open, Royal Challenge Grand Prix, DHL Challenge, Tata Open, Bangladesh Open, Hyundai Open, Forest Hill Golf Open, Cotton City Open
2003 Royal Challenge Grand Prix, DHL Pro-Am, DHL Challenge, HT Proi Golf
2004 Hyundai TNGF Open
2005 Hyundai TNGF Open, Hero Honda Open East, Vipul Indian Masters
2006 Hero Golf Chandigarh Open, ONGC Noida Open
2007 BILT Open Pro-Am

References

External links
Profile on Professional Golf Tour of India's official site

Indian male golfers
Golfers from Delhi
1965 births
Living people